A collectable or collectible (American English) is any object regarded as being of value or interest to a collector.

Collectables or collectibles may also refer to:

 Collectables Records, a record label
 Collectables by Ashanti, a 2005 Ashanti album
 Collectibles Vol 1,  a compilation album by Willie P. Bennett

See also
 List of collectibles